was a Japanese linguist, chiefly known for his dictations of yukar, or sagas of the Ainu people, as well as his study of the Matagi dialect. He is the author of the dictionary Meikai Kokugo Jiten.

Biography
Kindaichi was born in Morioka, Iwate Prefecture. His son Haruhiko Kindaichi was also a prominent linguist. He was active as a poet and had good contacts with Ishikawa Takuboku.

In popular culture 
A fictionalised Kindaichi appears in the anime Woodpecker Detective's Office.

Honours 
Order of Culture (1954)
Order of the Sacred Treasure, 1st class, Grand Cordon (1971, Posthumous award)
Junior Third Rank (1971, Posthumous award)

External links 

1882 births
1971 deaths
Linguists of Ainu
Linguists from Japan
Japanese lexicographers
University of Tokyo alumni
Academic staff of the University of Tokyo
Academic staff of Taisho University
People from Morioka, Iwate
Laureates of the Imperial Prize
Recipients of the Order of Culture
20th-century Japanese poets
20th-century linguists
20th-century lexicographers
Linguists of Japanese